"The Haunting of Villa Diodati" is the eighth episode of the twelfth series of the British science fiction television programme Doctor Who, first broadcast on BBC One on 16 February 2020. It was written by Maxine Alderton, and directed by Emma Sullivan. The episode stars Jodie Whittaker as the Thirteenth Doctor, alongside Bradley Walsh, Tosin Cole and Mandip Gill as her companions, Graham O'Brien, Ryan Sinclair and Yasmin Khan, respectively. The episode is about the historical origins of the 1818 novel Frankenstein; or, The Modern Prometheus by Mary Shelley, portrayed by Lili Miller, and takes place at the Villa Diodati in 1816 where she was inspired to write the work. The episode also featured the return of the Cybermen in their first television appearance since the tenth series finale "The Doctor Falls" (2017). The episode was watched by 5.07 million viewers, and received positive reviews from critics.

Plot 

The Doctor takes Graham, Ryan and Yaz to Lake Geneva in 1816 to witness Mary Shelley gain the inspiration to write Frankenstein, though she warns them about revealing this to her. Meanwhile Mary, her infant William, along with John Polidori, Claire Clairmont and Lord Byron are staying at the Villa Diodati.  Mary's fiancé Percy Bysshe Shelley, is inexplicably missing. Because of the inclement weather, Byron suggests each write a ghost story to scare the others.  Later, the Doctor and her companions arrive, only to discover that the expected ghost story sharing has been abandoned, and that Percy isn't there, although he should have been.

Strange events occur in the villa, such as the repeated rearrangement of its layout, objects moving of their own accord, and skeletal hands crawling around the halls. Byron suggests it is a ghost that haunts the villa but the Doctor suspects something else is occurring; the events are part of a security system designed to hide something. The group sees an apparition which the Doctor recognises as a being moving through time; the apparition resolves into a half-converted Cyberman.

Graham, Ryan and Yaz remind the Doctor of Jack Harkness's warning of the "lone Cyberman" and giving it what it wants but she angrily orders them not to follow her and tells them to protect Mary and the others, before heading off to confront the Cyberman. The Cyberman, named Ashad, was sent back in time to look for the "Cyberium", a liquid metal with the collective knowledge of the Cybermen. Ashad had tracked it to the villa but then his power had been sapped. As the Doctor tries to lure Ashad away from the villa, he is struck by lightning, recharging his power core and he prepares to attack the villa again.  Meanwhile, the Doctor discovers Percy's room, the walls of which are covered in strange gibberish in his handwriting.

The Doctor races to warn the others but instead finds Percy hiding in the cellar with a crazed look. She discovers he is possessed by the Cyberium, having found it a few days prior and the Cyberium had created the supernatural events to prevent discovery. She brings Percy to Ashad and to stop Ashad from killing him, tricks the Cyberium into leaving Percy's body and entering hers. Ashad threatens to destroy the planet, forcing the Doctor to turn the Cyberium over to him, despite Harkness's warning.

The Doctor and her companions depart, making plans to follow Ashad to the future using coordinates from Percy's Cyberman-based writings.

Continuity

Jack Harkness had asked Graham, Ryan and Yaz to warn the Doctor of the "lone Cyberman" in the episode "Fugitive of the Judoon". The Doctor, in warning her companions away from the Cyberman, is implied to allude to Bill Potts, a former companion of the Twelfth Doctor who was cyberconverted during the events of "World Enough and Time".

A series of Doctor Who Big Finish audioplays involve the Eighth Doctor meeting Mary Shelley around 1816, upon which she had joined him briefly as a companion. One 2011 audioplay, The Silver Turk, involves the two meeting a damaged Cyberman, which became an inspiration for Shelley to write Frankenstein.

Lord Byron was the father of Ada Lovelace, whom the Doctor and her companions had met in 1834 in this series' two-part premiere "Spyfall".

Production

Development 
"The Haunting of Villa Diodati" was written by Maxine Alderton. Chris Chibnall called Alderton "an absolute Mary Shelley and Byron… not a buff, she's an expert in that". Much of the setup of the episode is true to known fact for Lord Bryon, Mary and the others, including that the summer during their stay at the villa was unusually stormy due to the 1815 eruption of Mount Tambora that led to the "Year Without a Summer".

Casting 
Maxim Baldry appeared as Dr John Polidori in the episode. Nadia Parkes appeared as Claire Clairmont. Jacob Collins-Levy also appeared as Lord Byron. The Cybermen, set to appear in the twelfth series finale, first appeared in the episode.

Filming 
Emma Sullivan directed the fourth block, consisting of the seventh and eighth episodes. The Merthyr Mawr estate was the filming location for the villa's interiors.

Literary references
Early in the episode, Byron and the Doctor exchange lines of verse from Byron's short lyrical poem She Walks in Beauty written in 1814, and shortly after that he mentions his long narrative poem Childe Harold's Pilgrimage, which was published in instalments between 1812 and 1818.

Later, Ashad the Cyberman recites parts of Shelley’s long poem Queen Mab which was published in 1813. At the end of the episode Byron reads the conclusion from his own poem Darkness which he composed in July 1816.

Mary Shelley describes Ashad as a "Modern Prometheus", the alternate title for her novel Frankenstein.

Broadcast and reception

Television 
"The Haunting of Villa Diodati" aired on 16 February 2020.

Ratings 
"The Haunting of Villa Diodati" was watched by 3.86 million viewers overnight, making it the seventh most watched programme for the day in the United Kingdom. The episode had an Audience Appreciation Index score of 80. The episode received an official total of 5.07 million viewers across all UK channels and was the 31st most watched programme of the week.

Critical reception 
On Rotten Tomatoes, the episode received an approval rating of 94% based on reviews from 16 critics, with an average rating of 7.9/10. The site's consensus states: "A proper ghost story that strikes the perfect balance between horror and history, 'The Haunting of Villa Diodati' is Doctor Who at its best."

Patrick Mulkern of Radio Times rated it 5 stars, citing an "impressive" Jodie Whittaker, highlighting Emma Sullivan's direction, and calling the episode a "fine work indeed".

References

External links 

 
 
 

2020 British television episodes
Thirteenth Doctor episodes
Doctor Who stories set on Earth
Cultural depictions of John Polidori
Cultural depictions of Lord Byron
Cultural depictions of Mary Shelley
Cultural depictions of Percy Bysshe Shelley
Cybermen television stories
Doctor Who pseudohistorical serials
Fiction set in 1816
Television episodes set in Switzerland